Tallow may refer to:

 Tallow, rendered bovine fat, derived from Suet
 Tallow tree
 Chinese tallow, Chinese tallow tree (Sapium sebiferum); its flowers are a major source of nectar for bees to collect to make honey
 Tallow wood, name of several plants
 Tallow, County Waterford, Ireland, a town

See also 
 Worshipful Company of Tallow Chandlers, London-based livery company